Konan (stylised as KONAN, born 4 March 1985) is a Japanese singer, tarento, and gravure idol who is a former member of the female idol group SDN48. She is nicknamed .

She was born from Ikuno-ku, Osaka. She is the youngest of three sisters. She is represented by One Eight Promotion. She is also a member of the former idol dance unit Soul Tiger, and a former race queen.

Biography
From 2001 to 2002, she acted as the main vocal of the four-piece dance unit Soul Tiger, derived from the television programme Batoraku (Kansai Telecasting Corporation). The other members were Yumika Yoshii, Yuko Ishida, and Yuka Konan. At that time, Yuka was similar in entertainment name, so Yuka Konan was introduced as "Yumi Konan's cousin" in the programme. Incidentally, the entertainer name "Yuka Konan" conforms to that, and has never touched their blood relationship after the end of the programme.
She received a 7up! at the National Schoolgirl High School Uniform Collection 2001 sponsored by Shueisha. She was joined with Erika Sawajiri, Nao Nagasawa, etc.
In 2005 she transferred to One Eight Promotion.
In the same year, she became part of the Super GT Mach Queens (Haruna Amatsubo, Tomoe Takeuchi, Yuki Yanai).
Also in the same year, she belonged to entertainer women's futsal Nanzaku YJ Shooters (now South Games Shooters) and entered the Sphere League. Her number was "10" and her position is the pivo (FW) or ara (MF). She had some sharpness from the right side.
She acted as Super GT houzan's cosmos CircutLady in 2006.
In 2007, the gravure idol unit Venus (with Yumi Ando, Ami Tsubaki, and Airi Nagasaku) was formed.
In the same year, she received the designation from each representative of Jinro, Mandom, and Weekly Playboy (Shueisha) at ABC Venus Battle 2007–famous company image girl selection meeting (Asahi Broadcasting Corporation), and became responsible for the advertisement activity of the magazine Weekly Playboy.
2008, she became a regular student of TV Tokyo variety programme Onegai! Muscat and regular performer of the Ebisu Muscats.
She started as SDN48 (second generation) from 15 May 2010. Along with this, she graduated from Ebisu Muscats in Choito Muscat!
On 9 September 2010, Suppon no Onna-tachi (TV Asahi) announced twelve selected members who sing the SDN48 debut songs in the programme, finishing fourth in the final ranking (second generation stage top).
She graduated from SDN48 with SDN48 Concert "Next Encore" in NHK Hall held at NHK Hall on 31 March 2012.

Personal life
Her hobbies are dancing, singing, talking, shopping, and observing magazines.
Her special skills are dance, futsal, and basketball.
Her qualifications are Kanji kentei Level 2 and a 7 in ink brushing penmanship.
There are various opinions on the origins of her name, but the person herself said, adding  from the Hanshin Tigers that imagined her hometown of Osaka and  because she was born from the south of Osaka Prefecture.
Her relationship with Yuko Ishida was deep, and when she went to Tokyo she was sharing a room with her.
In Onegai! Muscat and Onedari!! Muscat she had a catchphrase "One wolf in Naniwa". This became the setting of her bullish, Kansai dialect, Hanshin Tigers fan character. In the corner with the same program, since Sola Aoi said "is it good with a gorilla character?", the nickname of the gorilla is established both inside and outside the programme. In addition, Konan herself said that she "can not do gorilla characters because I am doing gravure."
Rika Kawamura who co-starred in Onegai! Muscat and Onedari!! Muscat are best friends.
She Graduated from the programme Choito Muscat and its unit Ebisu Muscats on its 7 July 2010 broadcast. In the middle of the programme, a graduation ceremony was held in which members withdrawing in the form of fade-outs are unusual among most of them. Comments from herself and Rio's "letter" which is a member of Muscats were also read. On 10 July, three days after broadcasting, she appeared as a surprise to Ebisu Muscats First Concert Ebisu Muscats Satsujin Jiken –Utatte Odotte Korosa rete– and reported a graduation from the Muscats in front of fans.

References

External links
 
 – Ameba (1 October 2007 –) 
 – GREE 

1985 births
Living people
Japanese gravure idols
Ebisu Muscats
Musicians from Osaka